Composition X is an abstract oil painting executed in 1939  by the artist Wassily Kandinsky, a Russian-born émigré then living near Paris. It is in the collection of the Kunstsammlung Nordrhein-Westfalen, in Düsseldorf, Germany.

Compositions
Kandinsky likened painting abstract pictures to the process of composing music and referred to his major conceptual works as "compositions", as opposed to his lesser "improvisations". Composition X was the last of the 10 compositions he painted during his lifetime (he was then 73). Unusually for Kandinsky, who attached a spiritual significance to colors and geometric shapes, the predominant color of the painting is black, which for him suggested closure and the end of things. Floating on the black background are a variety of geometric shapes whose meaning is left to the viewer to decide.

See also
List of paintings by Wassily Kandinsky

References

External links 

1939 paintings
Paintings by Wassily Kandinsky
Abstract art